The Kalamazoo-class monitors were a class of ocean-going ironclad monitors begun during the American Civil War. Unfinished by the end of the war, their construction was suspended in November 1865 and the unseasoned wood of their hulls rotted while they were still on the building stocks. If the four ships had been finished they would have been the most seaworthy monitors in the US Navy. One was scrapped in 1874 while the other three were disposed of a decade later.

Design and description
John Lenthall, Chief of the Bureau of Construction and Repair, ordered Benjamin F. Delano, naval constructor at New York City, to design a wooden-hulled ironclad that would carry her armament in two gun turrets. It should carry enough coal to steam one week at full power with "sufficient speed to make good use of its ram". Gideon Welles, Secretary of the Navy, called them enlarged versions of the s with greater speed and "adapted to coast service", meaning more seaworthy.

The ships were designed to displace  and were 3,200 tons burthen. They were the largest ships to be built in navy shipyards to date.

Their unseasoned wooden hulls were massively reinforced by iron straps as well as iron stanchions to bear the enormous weight of their armor and guns. The Kalamazoos wrought iron side armor consisted of two layers of three-inch plates, backed by 21 inches of wood, six feet in height. The outer layer of armor extended  further below the waterline.

They were powered by two 2-cylinder horizontal direct-acting steam engines, each driving one   propellers, using steam generated by eight tubular boilers. Two large funnels were positioned between the turrets to handle the combustion gases from the boilers. The Kalamazoos were intended to carry  of coal.

The ships' main armament consisted of four smoothbore, muzzle-loading,  Dahlgren guns mounted in two twin-gun turrets. The turrets were protected by 15 inches of armor.

Ships

Construction and fate
Construction of the ships began between late 1863 and early 1864 and they were still being built when the war ended in early 1865. Construction was suspended on all four on 17 November 1865; they remained on the stocks. The ships were renamed, usually twice, in 1869 to conform to several new ship naming conventions. Vice Admiral David D. Porter ordered that Colossus be rebuilt to carry 10 large broadside guns and fitted with iron masts in a ship rig, but this never happened. The unseasoned wood in their hulls quickly began to rot after construction was suspended and they were broken up beginning in 1874. Unusually, Passaconaway was condemned by an Act of Congress on 5 August 1882 before she was finally broken up in 1884.

Notes

Footnotes

References

External links

  Dictionary of American Naval Fighting Ships entry on Kalamazoo
  Dictionary of American Naval Fighting Ships entry on Passaconaway
  Dictionary of American Naval Fighting Ships entry on Quinsigamond
  Dictionary of American Naval Fighting Ships entry on Shackamaxon

Cancelled ships of the United States Navy
Monitor classes